Lo Bue is a surname. Notable people with the surname include:

Giorgia Lo Bue (born 1994), Italian lightweight rower
Serena Lo Bue (born 1995), Italian lightweight rower

See also
Bue (surname)

Surnames of Italian origin